The Sibley Railroad Bridge is a three-span through truss single-track railroad bridge belonging to the BNSF Railway between Jackson County, Missouri, and Ray County, Missouri, at Sibley.  The bridge carries the BNSF Marceline Subdivision over the Missouri River. It is the only single-track segment of the subdivision. The original 1887–88 bridge was a three-span Whipple through truss and was later reconstructed with Parker through truss spans.  Besides the freight trains of BNSF Railway, it is also used by Amtrak's Southwest Chief.

After reaching the south bank of the river, the tracks curve west and pass Kansas City Power & Light Company's Sibley Operating Station, a coal-fired electrical generating plant. A now-removed loop track around the plant formerly allowed coal delivery to the plant by rail. The plant's 757-foot chimney is visible from several miles away.

The bridge can be viewed from the observation deck of the Fort Osage visitor's center.

See also
List of crossings of the Missouri River

References
Bridgehunter.com profile

Buildings and structures in Jackson County, Missouri
Buildings and structures in Ray County, Missouri
BNSF Railway bridges
Atchison, Topeka and Santa Fe Railway
Railroad bridges in Missouri
Parker truss bridges in the United States